PA 103 can refer to:
Pan Am Flight 103
Pennsylvania Route 103